Cilicia was a satrapy of the Achaemenid Empire, with its capital being Tarsus. It was conquered sometime in the 540's BC by Cyrus the Great. Cilicia was a vassal, and although it had a vassal king it had to pay a tribute of 360 horses and 500 talents of silver, according to Herodotus. The fertile Cilician plains were the most important part of the satrapy.

There were several sanctuaries that remained more or less independent from Persian rule. Some of these included Castabala, Mazaca, and Mallus.

The last vassal king of Cilicia became involved in the civil war between Artaxerxes II and Cyrus the Younger. Having sided with Cyrus the Younger, who was defeated, the king was dethroned and Cilicia became an ordinary satrapy.

The second to last satrap (governor) of Cilicia was the Babylonian Mazaios. Shortly afterwards, his successor was expelled by Alexander the Great.

The region was later incorporated by the Roman Empire.

See also
Cilicia
Çukurova
Adana
Cilician Gates

Notes

References
Cilicia 

 
Achaemenid satrapies
Former countries in Western Asia